Conor Laverty is a Gaelic footballer who plays for Kilcoo and, formerly, the Down county team. He has been manager of the Down county team since 2022.

Career
Laverty played at senior level for the Down county team. He played as a forward. Announcing Laverty's reign as Down manager, the county board stated that he had played for Down at all levels, was involved in the 2010 All-Ireland Senior Football Championship Final and the 2012 Ulster Senior Football Championship final, received an All Star nomination in 2012, captained his county in 2015, had by that stage won ten county championships with his club Kilcoo and was joint captain when Kilcoo won Ulster titles in 2019 and 2020 and the All-Ireland title in 2021. He was also captain when Kilcoo won the 2021–22 All-Ireland Senior Club Football Championship.

Laverty was involved with the St Michael's, Enniskillen team that won both the 2019 MacRory Cup and Hogan Cup. After being a selector or a coach under Monaghan boss Séamus McEnaney in 2020, Laverty was involved in Down's Ulster Under-20 Football Championship win in 2021.

Laverty, after winning about 10 Down Senior Football Championship titles with Kilcoo, was set to be appointed as Down boss in 2021 but was not appointed on that occasion.

Personal life
Laverty is GAA development officer for Trinity College.

References

Year of birth missing (living people)
Living people
Down inter-county Gaelic footballers
Kilcoo Gaelic footballers
Gaelic football coaches
Gaelic football managers
Gaelic football selectors